Death Gospel is a genre of music popularized in the 21st century by Soul/Americana artist Adam Arcuragi, and his band.

It draws from traditional Folk, Gospel and Soul music, Outlaw Country and the original old hymns and traditionals from the Southern United States, which are often characterized by their dominant vocals.

The focal point of the music is its rich lyrical content; containing messages or underlying themes that are meant to be understood and interpreted on multiple levels. The songs and instrumentation are considered a binding agent between humanity, which aims to connect them in common and spiritual way, as described by Paste Magazine.  Other outlets and publications to write or discuss the genre include: NPR, American Songwriter, The Vinyl District, Stereo Subversion, Philadelphia Citypaper, and The Colorado Springs Independent, and mentions of it have been made on The Huffington Post (in an interview with Arcuragi), The DCist, and live on NPR's "All Songs Considered".

The name derives from the Old English “godspell” which translates as ‘bringing the good word or good news’.   The theme of Death, serves as the common denominator of all human beings - the inevitable shared fate that makes life so wonderful, much like music itself; a celebration.  In Arcuragi's own words (as published by the Huffington Post), the Death component and tie to the music is "anything that sees the inevitability of death as a reason to celebrate the special wonder that is being alive and sentient. That's the hope with the songs. . . . It is exciting that we can reflect upon it as intelligent life and do something to make that wonder manifest."

There has been some debate over the religious relevance of the genre's title.  In February 2012, Professor M. Cooper Harriss of Virginia Tech published an article, in association with the University of Chicago School Of Divinity, about the Death Gospel genre and its connection to modern culture.  In it, he concludes that "Death Gospel offers an interesting rejoinder to a culture that denies death and decay, insisting instead that particular individualities require a universal point of convergence; it addresses a generation of young adults (and their elders) who, despite their spirituality and electronic connections, feel alienated from their traditions (religious or otherwise), from their humanity, and from one another."

References

Gospel music genres